The 2012 6 Hours of Shanghai was an endurance auto race held at the Shanghai International Circuit in Shanghai, China on 28 October 2012.  The race was the eighth and season finale of the 2012 FIA World Endurance Championship season, and was the inaugural running of the 6 Hours of Shanghai.

The race was won by Alexander Wurz and Nicolas Lapierre driving  the No.7 Toyota TS030 Hybrid of Toyota Racing. André Lotterer, Benoît Tréluyer and Marcel Fässler of Audi Sport Team Joest won the Drivers' World Championship at the event after finishing in third place. Larbre Compétition won the LMGTE Am Trophy following a class win.

Qualifying

Qualifying result
Pole position winners in each class are marked in bold.

Race

Race result
Class winners in bold. Cars failing to complete 70% of winner's distance marked as Not Classified (NC).

References

6 Hours of Shanghai
Shanghai
Shanghai